The 2006 Tuvalu A-Division was the sixth season of association football competition. the league was won by Lakena United for the second time. the format of the league was changed for this season, rather than a single division, the teams were split into two pools, the winners of each pool then played each other in a single leg final to determine the champion. Kivoli Tehulu was the season's top scorer and Paueli Hemanaia won the player of the year award.

Pool stage
Pool 1 was won by Lakena United A, whilst Pool B was won by Nukufetau A.

Championship game
Lakena United beat Nukufetau to win their second national championship.

References

Tuvalu A-Division seasons
Tuvalu
football